The 2020 Tennessee Volunteers softball team represents the University of Tennessee in the 2020 NCAA Division I softball season. The Volunteers play their home games at Sherri Parker Lee Stadium.

Previous season

The Volunteers finished the 2019 season 43–17 overall, and 14–10 in the SEC to finish in a tie for second in the conference. The Volunteers hosted a regional during the 2019 NCAA Division I softball tournament and later advanced to the Gainesville Super Regional against Florida. The Volunteers were defeated by the Gators 1 game to 2 as Florida advanced to the WCWS.

Preseason

SEC preseason poll
The SEC preseason poll was released on January 15, 2020.

Schedule and results

Source:
*Rankings are based on the team's current ranking in the NFCA poll.

Rankings

References

Tennessee
Tennessee Volunteers softball seasons
Tennessee Volunteers softball